A nymphaeum or nymphaion, in ancient Greece and Rome, was a monument consecrated to the nymphs, especially those of springs.

These monuments were originally natural grottoes, which tradition assigned as habitations to the local nymphs. They were sometimes so arranged as to furnish a supply of water, as at Pamphylian Side. A nymphaeum dedicated to a local water nymph, Coventina, was built along Hadrian's Wall, in the northernmost reach of the Roman Empire. Subsequently, artificial grottoes took the place of natural ones.

Roman period
The nymphaeum in Jerash, Jordan (illustration, above right), was constructed in 191 AD. The fountain was originally embellished with marble facing on the lower level, painted plaster on the upper level, and topped with a half-dome roof, forming a giant niche. Water cascaded through seven carved lion's heads into small basins on the sidewalk.
 
The nymphaea of the Roman period, which extended the sacral use to purely recreational ones, were borrowed from the constructions of the Hellenistic east. The majority of them were rotundas, and were adorned with statues and paintings. They served the threefold purpose of sanctuaries, reservoirs and assembly-rooms. A special feature was their use for the celebration of marriages. Such nymphaea existed in Corinth, Antioch and Constantinople; the remains of some twenty have been found in Rome and many in Africa. The so-called exedra of Herodes Atticus (which corresponds in all respects to a nymphaeum in the Roman style), the nymphaeum in the palace of Domitian and those in Hadrian's Villa in Tivoli (Tibur) — five in number — may be specially mentioned.

Mosaics
Nymphaea were important in the architectural movement of mosaic from floor to walls and ceiling vaults in the 1st century.  Initially they were often decorated with geometrical mosaics often incorporating shells, but by the end of the century could contain ambitious figure subjects.

Later periods

The term nymphaeum was also applied to the fountains of water in the atrium of the Christian basilica, which according to Eusebius were symbols of purification. Phiale is an equivalent Greek term.

A nymphaeum for al fresco summer dining featuring artificial grottoes with waterflows was designed by Bartolomeo Ammanati (1550–1553), and was reintroduced at the Villa Giulia, Rome.

Gallery

See also
Roman gardens

Notes

References

(LacusCurtius website) S.B. Plattner and T. Ashby, A Topographical Dictionary of rome, 1929: "Nymphaeum"

Ancient Greek religion
Ancient Roman religion
Types of monuments and memorials
Architectural elements
Garden features
Fountains
Grottoes
Nymphs